John Herbert Ross McKeen (born October 19, 1946), is a Canadian physician, 
acupuncturist, author and lecturer who co-founded the Haven Institute with Bennet Wong. He has written on East-West medicine, alternative medicine, holistic health, Asian studies and personal growth.

Education and honours
McKeen received his M.D. from the University of Western Ontario in 1970, and did his medical internship at the Royal Columbian Hospital, New Westminster, B.C., Canada, 1970-71. He received a Lic.Ac.(UK), from the College of Chinese Acupuncture, Oxford, England, in 1974. He was inducted into Alpha Omega Alpha Honour Medical Society in 1968. In 2012, he was awarded an honorary Doctor of Letters by Vancouver Island University for his work with Bennet Wong in establishing the Haven Institute.

Career

Individual career
McKeen was a regular panelist for many years on the weekly television quiz show Take Your Choice. In 1969, he was part of a medical field clinic in Jamaica.  In 1969 and 1970, he worked in street clinics and drug crisis centres with the Alcoholism and Drug Addiction Research Foundation, London, Ontario. Between 1971-1974, McKeen was on the staff of the Royal Columbian Hospital in New Westminster, B.C., working in emergency medicine. In 1973-74, he studied classical Chinese acupuncture with J. R. Worsley at the College of Chinese Acupuncture in  Oxford, England. He returned to Vancouver to establish a medical practice using acupuncture and psychological approaches.

McKeen has advocated integration of eastern and western medical approaches, encouraging western medicine to study oriental approaches and acupuncturist to cooperate with western medicine. He engaged in advocacy resulting in legislation permitting  nonmedical practitioners to use acupuncture.  From 1984-88, he was a member of the Senate of the Academy of Sciences for Traditional Chinese Medicine in Victoria, B.C.,  which established the Canadian College of Acupuncture and Oriental Medicine. He was appointed in 1988 as a Charter Member of the American Academy of Medical Acupuncture. From 1987 on, he has been teaching classical Chinese philosophy and medicine in Asia.
 He was appointed Professor of Humanistic Psychology at Hua Wei University in Shen Zhen, China in 2007.

Partnership with Bennet Wong
He  worked jointly with the Canadian psychiatrist Bennet Wong since 1970 in group psychotherapy and growth groups until Wong's death in 2013. Their long-standing professional partnership is the subject of Ben and Jock: A Biography by Gerry Fewster.  They proposed a harmonious blending of eastern and western medical approaches.  They conducted onsite trainings in Thailand for the Peace Corps, and taught a 20-day seminar entitled "Harmony: East-West Integration" in Taipei, Taiwan, and Beijing, China. A core thesis of their living philosophy is that people become ill when they hold back from each other, and can become healthier in the revelation of an intimate relationship. 
They have written and lectured about human sexuality. 
Couples, a video series that documents their relationship work, has been featured on PBS television.

From 2004 until 2008, they were consultants to Hua Wei Corporation, a Chinese global telecommunications company, advising about management training and corporate development. Their belief was that business can be a vehicle for relationship development, and thus a way to enhance health, wellness and life fulfillment.

The Haven Institute

Wong and McKeen founded the Haven Institute in 1983 and were active in its development until 2004, when they passed their ownership of the Institute into The Haven Foundation, a federally recognized Canadian non-profit charity. Both men are now Emeritus Faculty of The Haven Institute.

References

Selected McKeen peer-reviewed journal articles
.
.
.

Wong and McKeen collaborative publications

Books

.
.
.
.
.
.
.
.
.

Selected peer-reviewed journal articles

.
.
.
.
.
.
.
.
.
.
.
.

External links

Curriculum Vitae for Jock McKeen - link on The Haven's Founders' page

Jock McKeen's Eulogy for Father Jack Sproule (2016)
"Psychology in China" - article by Jock McKeen & Bennet Wong - link at bottom of page
"Following Your Energy" - article by Wong/McKeen - link at bottom of page
Jock McKeen's Foreword for Mcintosh & Sproule, "Dark Matter" (2013)
Our-Relationship-Odyssey.pdf Downloadable Chapter from McKeen & Wong: Health and Happiness - link at bottom of page
Jock McKeen & Bennet Wong Honorary Doctorate from Vancouver Island University 2012
Wong McKeen Photo - Doctor of Letters 2012

"The Haven's History" - video interview with Jock McKeen
Review of McKeen/Wong: The Illuminated Heart: Perspectives on East-West Psychology and Thought

1946 births
People from Owen Sound
Canadian health and wellness writers
Canadian addiction physicians
Living people
Canadian non-fiction writers
New Age writers
Traditional Chinese medicine practitioners
Human Potential Movement
University of Western Ontario alumni
Mckeen
Acupuncturists